Out in L.A. is a compilation of rare tracks by the Red Hot Chili Peppers released November 1, 1994, on EMI.

Background
The tracks contained are varied with the inclusion of four remixes, live cover songs of Jimi Hendrix and Thelonious Monk ("F.U." is a joke lyric over the melody of "Bemsha Swing"), the band's first demos and joke songs. The 1988 outtake, "Blues for Meister", which was the first song sung by Flea that the band released, was the only song released or recorded with then guitarist DeWayne McKnight who would soon be replaced by John Frusciante that same year. The song uses a backing track recorded by Flea and Irons, before Slovak's death.

The songs "Stranded" and "Flea Fly" are two of the band's earliest recordings from 1983 when they went under the name Tony Flow And The Miraculously Majestic Masters Of Mayhem. The other demo recordings included come from the band's first demo tape are the first the band made and are described in Anthony Kiedis' autobiography Scar Tissue as being the most prolific sessions the band ever had. The demo recording was produced by Spit Stix, Flea's then bandmate in the legendary punk band, Fear. Four of these songs were recorded with Jack Sherman and Cliff Martinez on the band's first album however, these early versions are said to be the preferred ones as they capture the original vibe intended. Hillel Slovak's and Jack Irons's playing are instrumental to this. Many of these tracks were included in the remastered versions of the band's first two albums and it was these demos that eventually got the band their first shows and eventually a recording contract with EMI. The band's joke cover of "Deck the Halls" was released as a very rare 7-inch promotional jukebox single in 1994. "Knock Me Down" was featured as the track's b-side.

Track listing

Notes
A majority of the track lengths given on the back cover are incorrect, most notably for "Flea Fly", which is listed as 1:37. Another key mistake was the listing of the incorrect recording dates for the demos. The booklet states they were recorded in 1982 however the band did not form until 1983. Neither of these mistakes were ever corrected. The album also fails to even list recording dates for a few songs most notably "Blues for Meister" and "Deck the Halls".

Personnel
Red Hot Chili Peppers
Anthony Kiedis – lead vocals
Hillel Slovak – guitar (on tracks 2–4, 8–13, 15–18)
Jack Irons – drums (on tracks 4, 8–18)
John Frusciante – guitar (on tracks 1, 5–7)
Flea – bass, lead vocals (on track 14), trumpet
Chad Smith – drums (on tracks 1, 5–7)
Cliff Martinez – drums (on tracks 2–3)
DeWayne McKnight – guitar, backing vocals (uncredited) (on track 14)

Additional musicians
Keith Barry – backing vocals

Production
Michael Barbiero – remixing
Michael Beinhorn – producer
Tom Cartwright – compilation/soundtrack producer
George Clinton – producer
Daddy O – engineer for remixes, producer
Ben Grosse – remixing
Bruce Harris – executive producer
Dave Jerden – mix engineer
Spit Stix –  producer (on tracks 8–13, 15–18)
Steve Thompson – producer, remixing
Vincent M. Vero – compilation/soundtrack producer

References

Red Hot Chili Peppers compilation albums
1994 compilation albums
Capitol Records compilation albums
EMI Records compilation albums